Events in the year 1564 in Norway.

Incumbents
Monarch: Frederick II

Events
Northern Seven Years War: 
February – Swedish troops occupy Jemtland, Herjedalen and Trøndelag. Trøndelag is retaken the same year, but Jemtland and Herjedalen is given back in 1570.
Helgeseter Priory is burned down by Swedish forces.
 22 May – Norwegian forces under the command of Erik Rosenkrantz retakes Steinvikholm Castle from Swedish troops.

Arts and literature

Births
28 June – Cort Aslakssøn astronomer, theologist and philosopher (died 1624).

Deaths

See also

References